Nerul is a railway station on the Harbour Line of the Mumbai Suburban Railway network. Around 100,000 people travel from Nerul towards Mumbai CST daily, and around 50,000 people travel in the Panvel direction every day. Nerul station has become a terminus point for Uran trains. Nerul is a terminal station for some trains going towards Thane.

References 

Railway stations in Thane district
Mumbai Suburban Railway stations
Mumbai CR railway division